Sioux City is a city in Woodbury and Plymouth counties in the northwestern part of the U.S. state of Iowa. The population was 85,797 in the 2020 census, making it the fourth-largest city in Iowa. The bulk of the city is in Woodbury County, of which it is the county seat, though a small portion is in Plymouth County. Sioux City is located at the navigational head of the Missouri River. The city is home to several cultural points of interest including the Sioux City Public Museum, Sioux City Art Center and Sergeant Floyd Monument, which is a National Historic Landmark. The city is also home to Chris Larsen Park, commonly referred to as "the Riverfront", which includes the Anderson Dance Pavilion, Sergeant Floyd Riverboat Museum and Lewis and Clark Interpretive Center. 
Sioux City is the primary city of the five-county Sioux City, IA–NE–SD Metropolitan Statistical Area (MSA), with a population of 149,940 in the 2020 census. The Sioux City–Vermillion, IA–NE–SD Combined Statistical Area had a population of 175,638 as of 2020.

Sioux City and the surrounding areas of northwestern Iowa, northeastern Nebraska and southeastern South Dakota are sometimes referred to as Siouxland, especially by local media and residents.

History

Iowa is in the tallgrass prairie of the North American Great Plains, historically inhabited by speakers of Siouan languages.
The area of Sioux City was inhabited by Yankton Sioux when it was first reached by Spanish and French furtrappers in the 18th century. The first documented US citizens to record their travels through this area were Meriwether Lewis and William Clark during the summer of 1804.  Sergeant Charles Floyd, a member of the Lewis and Clark Expedition, died here on August 20, 1804, the only death during the two and a half-year expedition.

Sioux City was laid out in the winter of 1854–1855. It became a major transportation hub to the western Plains, including Mormons heading to Salt Lake City and speculators heading to Wyoming goldfields.

In 1891, the Sioux City Elevated Railway was opened and became the third steam-powered elevated rapid transit system in the world, and later the first electric-powered elevated railway in the world after conversion in 1892. However, the system fell into bankruptcy and closed within a decade.

The city gained the nickname "Little Chicago" during the Prohibition era due to its reputation for being a purveyor of alcoholic beverages.

On , United Airlines Flight 232 crash-landed at Sioux Gateway Airport, killing 111 people, but 184 survived the crash and ensuing fire due to outstandingly quick performances by fire and emergency local teams.

According to a 2015 University of Iowa study for the Iowa Initiative for Sustainable Communities, blight and disinvestment are serious problems in the downtown core as investment has shifted to suburbs.

Geography
Sioux City borders two states, South Dakota to the west-northwest and Nebraska to the west.

City neighborhoods

Climate
As is typical of Iowa, Sioux City has a humid continental climate, with very warm, humid summers, cold, dry winters, and wide temperature extremes; it is part of USDA Hardiness zone 5a. The average window for freezing temperatures is October 1 through April 26, allowing a growing season of 157 days.

On , the high temperature reached , setting a new all-time May record high, along with a  rise from the morning of the 12th.

Demographics

2020
As of the census of 2020, there were 85,797 people. The racial makeup of the city was 76.3% White, 4.8% African American, 2.2% Native American, 2.9% Asian, 0.6% Pacific Islander, and  10.1% from other races or from two or more races. Hispanic or Latino of any race were 20.9% of the population.

2010 census
As of the census of 2010, there were 82,684 people, 31,571 households, and 20,144 families residing in the city. The racial makeup of the city was 80.6% White, 2.9% African American, 2.6% Native American, 2.7% Asian, 0.1% Pacific Islander, 7.4% from other races, and 3.7% from two or more races. Hispanic or Latino of any race were 16.4% of the population.

There were 31,571 households, of which 34.3% had children under the age of 18 living with them, 44.2% were married couples living together, 13.8% had a female householder with no husband present, 5.9% had a male householder with no wife present, and 36.2% were non-families. 29.4% of all households were made up of individuals, and 11.1% had someone living alone who was 65 years of age or older. The average household size was 2.54 and the average family size was 3.14.

The median age in the city was 33.7 years. 26.6% of residents were under the age of 18; 11.4% were between the ages of 18 and 24; 25.6% were from 25 to 44; 24% were from 45 to 64, and 12.4% were 65 years of age or older. The gender makeup of the city was 49.2% male and 50.8% female.

2000 census
As of the census of 2000, there were 85,013 people, 32,054 households, and 21,091 families residing in the city. The racial makeup of the city was 85.23% White, 2.41% African American, 1.95% Native American, 2.82% Asian, 0.04% Pacific Islander, 5.27% from other races, and 2.28% from two or more races. Hispanic or Latino of any race were 10.89% of the population.

There were 32,054 households, of which 33.4% had children under the age of 18 living with them, 49.1% were married couples living together, 12.2% had a female householder with no husband present, and 34.2% were non-families. 27.7% of all households were made up of individuals, and 11.3% had someone living alone who was 65 years of age or older. The average household size was 2.57 and the average family size was 3.14.

Age spread: 27.1% under the age of 18, 11.0% from 18 to 24, 28.5% from 25 to 44, 20.2% from 45 to 64, and 13.3% who were 65 years of age or older. The median age was 33 years. For every 100 females, there were 95.4 males. For every 100 females age 18 and over, there were 92.2 males.

Males had a median income of  versus  for females. About 7.9% of families and 11.2% of the population were below the poverty line, including 15.0% of those under age 18 and 7.8% of those age 65 or over. (current data from State of Iowa, see also List of U.S. states by income for historical data).

Metropolitan area
As of the 2020 census, the Sioux City Metropolitan Area had 149,940 residents in four counties. As defined by the Office of Management and Budget, the counties comprising the metropolitan area are (in descending order of population):
 Woodbury County, Iowa
 Dakota County, Nebraska
 Union County, South Dakota
 Dixon County, Nebraska

Crime
Sioux City has a crime rate that is 91% higher than the average for Iowa and 63% higher than the national average. The violent crime rate is 90% above the Iowa average and 49% higher than the national average, based on the FBI's uniform crime reports for the year of 2020. According to the report, this represented an 12% decrease over the prior year.

Economy

Top employers
Statistics from Sioux City's 2020 Comprehensive Annual Financial Report

Arts and culture

 The Sioux City Public Museum was originally located in a Northside neighborhood of fine Victorian mansions. The portico-and-gabled stone building was originally the home of the banker, John Peirce, and was built in 1890. The museum was recently relocated to downtown Sioux City, where it features Native American, pioneer, early Sioux City, and natural history exhibits.
 The Sioux City Art Center, located Downtown, was formed in 1938 as part of the WPA's support of the arts. The Art Center supports artists from Iowa and the greater Midwest. Also, the Center has a general program of acquisition of work by national and international artists, including important works by Thomas Hart Benton, Salvador Dalí, Käthe Kollwitz, Robert Motherwell, Claes Oldenburg, James Abbott McNeill Whistler, and Grant Wood.
 The Sergeant Floyd Monument commemorates the burial site of U.S. Army Sergeant Charles Floyd, the only man to die on the Lewis and Clark Expedition.
 Chris Larsen Park, informally known as "The Riverfront," includes the Anderson Dance Pavilion, the Sergeant Floyd Riverboat Museum and the Lewis and Clark Interpretive Center, opened in 2004. Missouri River development began in 2005 with the opening of the MLR Tyme Marina area, which included Bev's on the River, an upscale restaurant, that has now become Crave.
 The Sioux City Symphony Orchestra (SCSO) was founded in 1915. The orchestra continues offering seven concerts within its annual season. Performances take place in the Orpheum Theatre in Sioux City, Iowa. Concert dates run from September to April each year. The SCSO has included several movie scores, with film, on its concert schedule. The SCSO's education programming reaches 9,000 to 12,000 young people via the partnership with Carnegie Hall's Link Up program with 100 orchestras in the country, programs for SCSO musicians to perform and teach music lessons in the schools, and performances in nursing homes, hospitals, and elsewhere.
 Milwaukee Railroad Shop is a  facility that is being renovated by the Siouxland Historical Railroad Association. It includes a 4-6-2 Pacific type steam locomotive, the Great Northern 1355, a model railroad exhibit, as well as multiple buildings including the roundhouse that are open to the public.
 Grandview Park is located north of the downtown area, up from Rose Hill, between The Northside and The Heights. The Municipal Bandshell is located in the park with Sunday evening municipal band concerts. The Saturday in the Park music festival began in 1991 and is held there annually on a weekend close to the Fourth of July holiday. Behind the bandshell is a rose garden with an arbor and trellises which has been a site for outdoor weddings, prom and other special occasion photographs, and for children to play during the Sunday evening band concerts and other events. Downtown is also home to the historic Orpheum Theatre. In 1927 when it was built, it was the largest theater in Iowa.
 Theatre is produced in Sioux City by three main entities, the Sioux City Community Theatre (SCCT), LAMB Arts Regional Theatre, and Shot in the Dark Productions. Each of these produce a full season of shows each year.

Sports

 The Sioux City Bandits are an indoor football team that play in Champions Indoor Football. The Bandits play their home games at the Tyson Events Center.
 The Sioux City Explorers are an independent baseball team playing in the American Association. The Explorers play their home games at Lewis and Clark Park. They have been to the league playoffs five times.
 The Sioux City Musketeers are a junior hockey team based in Sioux City. They play in the United States Hockey League (USHL). They play their home games at the Tyson Events Center. Their first year of hockey was in 1972. The Musketeers have won the gold cup in the 1985-1986 season, the National Runner-up twice (1993–94, 1995–96), the Anderson Cup three times (1981–82, 1985–86, 2016–17), the Clark Cup three times (1981–82, 1985–86, 2001–02), and Western Division Champions for the 2004–05, and 2016-17 seasons.
 The Sioux City Roller Dames were a non-profit roller derby corporation. The Roller Dames played all home games at the Longlines Family Recreation Center. The Dames hosted their first tournament in November 2008 and dissolved in December 2016.
 In the late 19th century, the Sioux City Cornhuskers played baseball in the Western League. After a five-year stint in St. Paul, Minnesota, the league changed its name to the American League, and the team moved to Chicago, where it continues today as the Chicago White Sox.
 The Sioux City Stampede play amateur outdoor football in the Midwest Football Alliance.
 The Sioux City Swine plays rugby union.

Parks and recreation

 Stone State Park is in the northwest corner of the city, overlooking the South Dakota/Iowa border. Stone Park is near the northernmost extent of the Loess Hills, and is at the transition from clay bluffs and prairie to sedimentary rock hills and bur oak forest along the Iowa side of the Big Sioux River. The park is used by picnickers, day hikers, and for mountain biking.
 Dorothy Pecaut Nature Center is a destination nature preserve for Woodbury County, and is located within the boundaries of Stone State Park. The butterfly garden is unique to the area; wild turkeys and white-tail deer are commonly sighted from the well-marked trails.
 Downtown entertainment venues include the Hard Rock Hotel & Casino, the 10,000-seat Tyson Events Center/ Fleet Farm Arena, Sioux City Orpheum Theatre, Promenade Cinema 14 and the Anderson Dance Pavilion which overlooks the Missouri River.
 Pulaski Park is named for the Polish General Kazimierz Pułaski, who fought in the American Revolution. This park features baseball diamond facilities, and is located in western Morningside along old U.S. Highway 75 (South Lewis Blvd.). It is largely built on the filled lakebed of Half Moon Lake, which was originally created in the 1890s by the excavation of fill dirt to build the approaches for the iron railroad bridge spanning the Missouri near the stockyards. 
The house and grounds are currently being restored by the Friends of Latham Park.
 First Bride's Grave is tucked in a corner pocket of South Ravine Park, lies a series of paths, trails, and steps leading to the grave of the First Bride of Sioux City, Rosalie Menard. She was the first bride of a non-Native American to be wed in Sioux City, Iowa, thus receiving her title.
 War Eagle Park is named for the Yankton Sioux chief Wambdi Okicize who befriended early settlers. A monument overlooks the confluence of the Big Sioux and Missouri Rivers. The sculpture represents the chief in his role as a leader and peacemaker, wearing the eagle feather bonnet and holding the ceremonial pipe.
 Riverside Park is located on the banks of the Big Sioux River. One of the oldest recreational areas of the city, it is home to the Sioux City Boat Club and Sioux City Community Theater. The park is on land that once belonged to the first white settler in the area, Théophile Bruguier; his original cabin is preserved in the park.
 Bacon Creek Park is located northeast of Morningside and features a scenic walking trail, dog park, picnic shelters, and playground equipment.

Golf courses, city parks, and aquatics: Sioux City is also home to several municipal public golf courses, including Floyd Park in Morningside, Green Valley near the Southern Hills, Sun Valley on the northern West Side, and Hidden Acres in nearby Plymouth County. Sioux City also has a number of private golf clubs, including Sioux City Country Club, and Whispering Creek Golf Club. Five public swimming pools/aquatics centers are located within Sioux City neighborhoods.

Education

Public schools
The Sioux City Community School District served 14,569 students in the 2018-2019 school year; there are three public high schools West High School, North High School, East High School (grades 9-12), three public Middle Schools, West Middle, North Middle, and East Middle (grades 6-8), and 19 Elementary Schools (grades K-5).

Because of sprawl, districts around Sioux City continue to grow at dramatic rates. South Sioux City, Hinton, North Sioux City, Lawton, Bronson, Elk Point, Jefferson, Vermillion, Le Mars, Hawarden, Akron, Westfield, Ponca, Sergeant Bluff, Wayne, Sioux Center, along with other school districts that serve many metro-area students.

Private schools
Bishop Heelan Catholic Schools is a centralized private Catholic School System that includes six schools: They teach preschool through twelfth grade.

Siouxland Christian School educates grades pre-K-12 and began in 1959.

Advanced education
Sioux City is home to Briar Cliff University, Morningside College, Western Iowa Tech Community College, St. Luke's College of Nursing, and the Bellevue University outreach center.

Media

Television stations
 KTIV, Channel 4, NBC affiliate (4.1); CW affiliate (4.2); MeTV affiliate (4.3); Court TV affiliate (4.4); Ion Television affiliate (4.5)
 KCAU-TV, Channel 9, ABC affiliate (9.1); Ion Mystery affiliate (9.2); Laff affiliate (9.3); Bounce TV affiliate (9.4)
 KMEG, Channel 14, Dabl affiliate (14.1); Charge! (TV network) affiliate (14.2); Comet affiliate (14.3); Stadium affiliate (14.4)
 KSIN, Channel 27, an Iowa PBS station: digital channels are PBS (27.1), PBS Kids (27.2), World Channel (27.3), and Create (27.4)
 KPTH, Channel 44, Fox affiliate (44.1); TBD affiliate and MyNetworkTV affiliate (44.2); CBS affiliate (44.3)

Radio stations

FM stations
 KFHC-FM, 88.1, Catholic radio featuring EWTN programming.
 KWIT, 90.3, National Public Radio owned by Western Iowa Tech Community College.
 KMSC, 92.9, college radio station operated by Morningside University.
 KGLI, 95.5, "KG95", adult contemporary.
 KSEZ, 97.9, "Z98", active rock.
 KKMA, 99.5, "Classic Rock 99.5", plays classic rock.
 KKYY, 101.3, "Y101.3", country music.
 KQNU, 102.3, ("Q 102.3"), adult hits.
 KTFC, 103.3, Religious radio broadcasting the Bott Radio Network.
 KSUX, 105.7, "The SuperPig, K-Sioux 105.7", country music.
 KSFT-FM, 107.1, "107.1 KISS FM", top 40.

AM stations
 KMNS, 620, sports talk radio.
 KSCJ, 1360, talk radio.
 KWSL, 1470, Spanish music.

Print
 Sioux City Journal, daily newspaper serving greater Sioux City area, including Iowa, Nebraska and South Dakota.
 Dakota County Star, weekly newspaper serving northeast Nebraska.
 Sioux City Hispanos Unidos, bi-weekly Spanish readers paper.
 The Weekender, weekly arts and entertainment magazine serving the Sioux City metro area east into Western Iowa and north to the South Dakota border.
 Siouxland Magazine, quarterly magazine with community/lifestyle features.

Infrastructure

Transportation

Highways
 Interstate 29.
 Interstate 129 is a bypass to surrounding suburbs. 
 Interstate 129. 
 U.S. Route 20.

Public transportation
Sioux City Transit, the local public transit organization, operates several bus lines within the city. Buses transfer downtown in the Martin Luther King Jr. Transportation Center at 505 Nebraska Street. The Sioux City Paratransit serves members of the community who would otherwise not be able to travel by providing door to door service.

Air
The city is served by Sioux Gateway Airport (SUX)  to its south where United Airlines' affiliate SkyWest Airlines has announced it plans to discontinue the one flight per day each to Chicago and Denver it currently offers. As those flights are federally subsidized under the Essential Air Service program, SkyWest is required to continue those flights until a replacement is found.

FBO and jet charter services are currently offered by Hawthorne Global Aviation Services.

Other transportation
Jefferson Lines runs long-distance bus routes to Sioux City. Non-Transfer destinations include Winnipeg, Kansas City, Minneapolis, and Omaha.

Sioux City also has several private taxi companies that operate within the city.

There is no established water or rail passenger transportation in the area. The last passenger train was the Illinois Central's Hawkeye, a daily train to Chicago via Waterloo, Dubuque and Rockford, discontinued in 1971.

Big Soo Terminal offers barge transportation.

Notable people 

 Oscar Micheaux, He was the first African American filmmaker in America. He lived in Sioux City on west 7th street when he started making films.
 John W. Aldridge, born in Sioux City, grew up in Tennessee, literary critic, author
 Jim Aton, jazz bassist, pianist, vocalist and composer with Billie Holiday, Bill Evans, Anita O'Day, others
 Dave Bancroft, (1891–1972) was a MLB shortstop and manager and member of the Baseball Hall of Fame
 Emmett Barrett, football player
 Joe Bisenius, Philadelphia Phillies relief pitcher, graduate of Bishop Heelan Catholic High School
 Tommy Bolin, born in Sioux City, member of Deep Purple and the James Gang, also had a solo career
 Bread of Stone, American contemporary Christian music and pop rock band formed in 2004. 
 Sally Brent, American distance runner and marathon winner.
 Mildred Brown, African-American journalist, worked in Iowa as teacher before moving to Omaha and founding Omaha Star
 Macdonald Carey, actor; the longtime patriarch on Days of Our Lives
 Paul B. Carpenter, California state legislator; born in Sioux City
 Matt Chatham, NFL linebacker, born in Newton, Iowa, graduate of North High School
 Eli Chesen, psychiatrist and writer
 Ron Clements, Disney animator, co-director of The Little Mermaid, Aladdin and The Princess and the Frog
 Vern Clark, former Chief of Naval Operations (CNO) in the United States Navy
 Carroll Edward Cole Serial Killer.
 Ryan Cownie, stand-up comedian, born in Sioux City
 Dave Croston (1963– ), former NFL player for Green Bay Packers
 Brigadier General George E. "Bud" Day, U.S. Air Force, Vietnam POW, recipient of the Medal of Honor; the United States' most highly decorated officer since General Douglas MacArthur; Sioux City's airport is named Brigadier General Bud Day Field in his honor, as is 6th Street (Honorable Bud Day Street)
 Leo Delperdang, born in Sioux City.  Member of Kansas House of Representatives
 W. Edwards Deming, born in Sioux City but raised in Polk City; quality-control expert, helped improve Japan's quality control
 Brittni Donaldson (1993–), current assistant coach with the Toronto Raptors; born in Sioux City and a graduate of North High School
 Todd Doxzon, football player
 Sharon Farrell (1940– ), actress (birth name Sharon Forsmoe)
 Tommy Lee Farmer, criminal, first person in US convicted under Three-strikes law
 Vergilius Ferm (1896-1974), philosopher, historian, and Compton Professor of Philosophy at the College of Wooster. 
 Susan Fessenden (1840–1932), founder/president, Sioux City YWCA; president, Sioux City WCTU
 Zeron Flemister, NFL tight end 2000-2005
 Bruce Forbes, author, professor of Religious Studies Morningside College
 For Today, a Christian metal band signed to Razor & Tie Records
 Esther and Pauline Friedman, better known as Ann Landers and Abigail Van Buren, respectively; advice columnists; both born in Sioux City and graduates of Central High School
 Lila-Gene George (1918-2017), composer and pianist
 Peggy Gilbert, jazz saxophonist and bandleader
 Dan Goldie, tennis player, winner of two ATP singles titles
 Fred Grandy, television actor who played Gopher Smith on The Love Boat; later became a U.S. congressman, CEO of Goodwill, and a radio personality for WMAL in Washington, D.C.
 Dick Green, former MLB second baseman with Kansas City and Oakland Athletics, raised in South Dakota
 Marcus Hahnemann, goalkeeper for United States men's national soccer team
 William L. Harding (1877–1934), born in Sibley, the 22nd Governor of Iowa 1917–1921
 John Harty, NFL defensive end 1981-1986, two-time Super Bowl champion
 Matthew C. Harrison, 13th president of the Lutheran Church–Missouri Synod
 Tim Hauff, jazz bassist, performed with Herbie Hancock, Wayne Shoter, Bruce Forman, others
 Alan Hurwitz, born in Sioux City, 10th president of Gallaudet University
 Kirk Hinrich, professional basketball player
 J.B.E. Hittle, author and historian
 Noah Holcomb, professional cyclist
 Harry Hopkins, Secretary of Commerce, moved to Council Bluffs shortly after birth, advisor to FDR during World War II
 Shelby Houlihan competed in the 5000m in the 2016 Rio Olympics.  Currently holds the American Record in the 5000.
 Fred Jackson, born in Fort Worth, Texas, attended Coe in Cedar Rapids; played football for Bandits and later NFL's Buffalo Bills
 Jacqui Kalin (born 1989), American-Israeli professional basketball player
 Ryan Kisor, jazz trumpeter
 Judy Kimball, LPGA champion golfer, member of Iowa Sports Hall of Fame
 Roy L. Kline, Brigadier general, USMC and Naval aviator
 George Koval (1913–2006), Soviet atomic spy and only Soviet agent to infiltrate the Manhattan Project
 Jerry Lacy, actor of theatre and television and films, primarily known for roles in the Gothic soap opera Dark Shadows
 Kian Lawley, Social Media Star, YouTuber and Actor, best known for being a member of O2L, a YouTube collab channel alongside JC Caylen.
 Bill Lewis, NFL center 1986-1993
 Dave Loebsack, U.S. congressman for Iowa's 2nd congressional district 
 Al McIntosh, born in Park River, North Dakota, newspaper editor whose columns are featured in Ken Burns' The War
 Jerry Mathers, actor, played Beaver Cleaver on TV's Leave It to Beaver
 Daniel Matousek, lead singer and guitarist for The Velaires, graduate of Central High School
 Max McGraw, Founder of McGraw-Edison and Centel, grew up in Sioux City
 John Melcher, U.S. Senator from Montana from 1977 to 1989
 Iris Meredith, actress
 Big Miller (Clarence Horatius Miller), jazz and blues singer and double bassist
 Constance Moore, singer and actress, star of 1940s films
 Marshall F. Moore, 7th Governor of Washington Territory
 John Mosher, jazz bassist, composer, with Cal Tjader, Brew Moore, Earl Hines, Tennessee Ernie Ford
 John Osborn, tenor
 Lori Petty, born in Chattanooga, Tennessee, actress best known for her starring role in A League of Their Own
 Frances Rafferty, MGM film actress of the 1940s, also known for TV sitcom December Bride
 Max Rafferty, brother of Frances Rafferty; California State Superintendent of Public Instruction from 1963 to 1971, was reared in Sioux City
 John Redwine, Iowa state senator and physician, lived in Sioux Falls
 Ann Royer, painter, sculptor
 Justin Sandy, NFL safety from 2004-2008
 Laurens Shull, All-American football player killed in France during World War I
 Edward J. Sperling, born in Slutsk, Belarus, Jewish writer and humorist
 Paul Splittorff, born in Evansville, Indiana, former Major League Baseball pitcher, attended college in Sioux City
 Doris June Struble, pianist, singer, and dramatic reader in 1910s, 1920s
 Morgan Taylor, athlete, set 400-meter hurdles Olympic record while winning gold medal in 1924, also NCAA champion, 1928 and 1932 Olympic bronze medalist
 Kyle Thousand, sports agent
 Gertrude Van Wagenen, Yale professor, pioneer in reproductive biology, primate research
 Ted Waitt, co-founder of Gateway, Inc.
 Brian Wansink, Former professor, discredited researcher and author of Mindless Eating: Why We Eat More Than We Think
 Pierre Watkin, actor in radio, films and TV from 1930s-1950s; played editor Perry White in original Superman serials
 Tony Watson, MLB pitcher for the Pittsburgh Pirates
 Kathleen Weaver, writer and editor
 Don Wengert, MLB pitcher from 1995 to 2001
 Paul Zaeske, football player
 R. Timothy Ziemer, born in Sioux City; Navy admiral, disease expert on the United States National Security Council

Sister cities
  Lake Charles, Louisiana (since 1995)
  Yamanashi, Yamanashi Prefecture, Japan (since 2003)
  Gjilan, Kosovo (since 2020)

See also

 Siouxland, the vernacular region in which Sioux City, Iowa, is located
 Mayors of Sioux City, Iowa, is a list of the known mayors of Sioux City, Iowa.

Note

References

External links
 

 
 
 

 
1854 establishments in Iowa
Cities in Iowa
Cities in Plymouth County, Iowa
Cities in Woodbury County, Iowa
County seats in Iowa
Iowa populated places on the Missouri River
Populated places established in 1854
Sioux City metropolitan area